Concord Township is one of twenty-six townships in Iroquois County, Illinois, United States. As of the 2010 census, its population was 466 and it contained 238 housing units.

Geography

Cities, towns, villages
 Iroquois

Cemeteries
The township contains these five cemeteries: Gaffield, Liberty, Morris Chapel, Old Texas and Prairie Dell.

Major highways
  U.S. Route 24
  U.S. Route 52

Airports and landing strips
 Zoomer Field

Demographics

School districts
 Donovan Community Unit School District 3

Political districts
 Illinois' 16th congressional district
 State House District 105
 State Senate District 53

References
 
 United States Census Bureau 2007 TIGER/Line Shapefiles
 United States National Atlas

External links
 City-Data.com
 Illinois State Archives

Townships in Iroquois County, Illinois
Townships in Illinois